Tooken is a 2015 American parody film directed by John Asher and starring Lee Tergesen, Margaret Cho, Lauren Stamile and Laura-Leigh and features cameos by Ethan Suplee, Donnie Wahlberg, Akon, Michael Blackson and Jenny McCarthy. The film spoofs the action film genre, focusing mainly on the Taken series.

Premise 
An ex-CIA agent who is now a mall security guard discovers that things are being taken from him. He must team up with his mom, also an ex-CIA agent, to defeat his rival and save his family.

References

External links 
 
 

2015 films
2010s parody films
American parody films
2015 comedy films
Taken (franchise)
2010s English-language films
2010s American films